The Maryland School for the Deaf (MSD) provides free public education to deaf and hard-of-hearing Maryland residents of aged zero to 21 years. Maryland School for the Deaf has two campuses: one in Frederick, Maryland and one in Columbia, Maryland.

History
The school was established in Frederick, Maryland in 1868 (Chapter 247, Acts of 1867; Chapter 409, Acts of 1868). The original buildings for the school were the Hessian Barracks, used during the Revolutionary War to detain Hessian mercenaries who were hired by the British. The buildings were later used by Lewis and Clark to store supplies before the beginning of their expedition.

The film Audible chronicles the school.

Philosophy
The Frederick campus offers both academic and life-based education, equivalent to a Maryland high school diploma or a Maryland School for the Deaf diploma. The school teaches communications skills in both English and American Sign Language (ASL), including speech and speech reading, fingerspelling, and auditory training, and the use of individual hearing aids. It also offers a broad athletic and physical education program, as well as social and recreational activities.

Maryland School for the Deaf (MSD) offers several Advanced Placement and Honors courses, each taught in American Sign Language. Academic classes range from American Government to History, Spanish, English, Biology, Algebra, and Chemistry, as well as offering a variety of elective courses. In 2007, MSD students passed the state exams (High School Assessments) at a higher rate than their hearing counterparts. MSD is a competitor in the Academic Bowl and were the 2008, 2010, 2011, 2012 Regional Champions. They also compete in various math and science competitions, generally placing in the top five.

Residency
Maryland School for the Deaf is also a residential school. It offers dormitories for both male and female students unable to travel by bus, which rooms from Monday to Friday. Maryland School for the Deaf's residential programs also offer after-school program (ASP) activities.

Athletics
Sports are immensely popular as an after-school activity. Both campuses have athletic fields and regulation sized basketball and volleyball courts. One of the buildings has an indoor swimming pool.

Middle and high school students participate in organized leagues and compete against public schools, private schools, and schools for deaf and hard of hearing students. MSD teams compete in national tournaments in various sports. MSD students are frequent competitors in the Deaflympics, and MSD coaches are often invited to coach the US teams. Current MSD sports include:

 Baseball
 Basketball
 Cheerleading
Cross Country
 Football
 Powerlifting
 Soccer (elementary only)
 Softball
 Track and field
 Volleyball
 Wrestling

Frederick
Established in 1868, the Frederick Campus of the Maryland School for the Deaf enrols deaf and hard-of-hearing students in pre-kindergarten through grade 12 (Chapter 247, Acts of 1867; Chapter 409, Acts of 1868). For young children (from birth to age five) and their families, the campus also provides language skill development.

At the Frederick campus, about thirty percent of enrolled students live on campus weeknights during the school year (late August through early June). Residential halls are staffed by student life counsellors who supervise students and coordinate after-school programming, such as intramural games, field trips, swimming, and hiking.

Underground, a 1950s style diner located on the Frederick campus, is student staffed and gives middle and high school students a place to meet friends, watch movies, buy snacks, and play pool and foosball. Checkers is decorated mainly with red, black and white colors relating to the game of checkers and 1950s diner colors. Checkers' sparkly red booths give it a 1950s feel. The snack bar offers sweets, chips and drinks. It also provides hot foods such as french fries, hot dogs, and mozzarella cheese sticks. Students also have the opportunity to gain experience by working at Checkers as a cashier or cook.

The Maryland State High School diploma or the Maryland School for the Deaf diploma is awarded to each graduating senior, and many graduates pursue higher education degrees. Vocational or technical training, and vocational rehabilitation services are available to help other graduates secure employment.

 Ely Building (1972–present): middle school and high school grades 6-12
 Veditz Building (1974–present): CTE, Study Work and LBE High School 
 New elementary building (2009–present): grades Toddler-5
 New cafeteria (2011–present)

Columbia
The Columbia campus of the Maryland School for the Deaf is located on a subdivision of the Otten Slave Farm Property in the former Pfeffer's Corner neighborhood. George Herman Otten combined a 91-acre parcel bought in 1853 with a 132-acre parcel, forming the Otten Farm. In 1935 his estate willed the farm to the regents of the University of Maryland. It became an agricultural research center, and later the "Horse Farm," researching race horse breeds. In 1979, a historical survey considered the property a significant historical resource, but a 25-page 1992 update considered the site not worth preservation, considering the university could move operations elsewhere. The property has been subdivided by government projects to the point where it is not recognisable as the original farm. Parcels were sold the state for the Route 100 project, and to the county for Waterloo Elementary. The remaining 68 acres were sold by the University to the Maryland State Department of Health and Mental Hygiene in 1968 to build the School for the Deaf campus, with 60 acres remaining for the university.

The school opened in September 1973. It serves 120 students with a 2015 budget of approximately $10 million and a staff of 109.5.

Notable alumni
 George W. Veditz (1878), Founded Maryland School for the Deaf Alumni Association, President of National Association of the Deaf, Preservation of the Sign Language
Leah Katz-Hernandez (2005), first deaf Receptionist of the United States (ROTUS) in the White House for President Barack Obama
Rodney Burford (2007), actor, known for portrayal of Tony Hughes in the Netflix drama Dahmer – Monster: The Jeffrey Dahmer Story
Nyle DiMarco (2007), model, actor, winner of reality television shows (America's Next Top Model and Dancing with the Stars)

References

External links

 http://www.msd.edu/
https://www.msdathletics.com/

Educational institutions established in 1868
Public elementary schools in Maryland
Public high schools in Maryland
Public middle schools in Maryland
Public K-12 schools in the United States
Schools for the deaf in the United States
Schools in Frederick County, Maryland
Buildings and structures in Frederick, Maryland
1868 establishments in Maryland
Education in Frederick, Maryland
Public boarding schools in the United States
Boarding schools in Maryland